YemenSoft Inc. is a Yemeni software company headquartered in Sana’a, Yemen. The company is known  for its creation of the enterprise software to manage business plans, operations, contracts and customer relations. It is headquartered in Sana’a, with regional offices in the Middle East, North America and Africa. As of 2015, YemenSoft solutions are being used by more than 11,000 clients in more than 14 countries.

History
YemenSoft was founded in Sana’a, Yemen by Ali Alyousify in 1993. Ali Alyousify began to seek for the opportunity in the enterprise performance market that provides customized developed software for small businesses, institutions and individual offices. He then launched Yemen soft as a software development company provides software to various sectors. The company announced their first financial system, Al-Mohaseb1 as an open source software.

After the completing  World Bank project in Yemen, YemenSoft started expanding in the Middle east and North Africa. It also initiated  its first office in Jeddah, Saudi Arabia in 2009 and Cairo, Egypt in 2010 after enhancing their services through new solutions "Motakamel plus and Onyx Pro". Ultimate Solution Inc. is the official distributor in Saudi Arabia and is a sister company.

Products
 Onyx Pro supports back office operations for large organization which includes financial, human resources, orders, manufacturing, inventory, shipping and billing.
 Motakamel Plus supports back office operations for Medium and small which includes financial, human resources, inventory, shipping and billing.
 AlMohasib1 is a free supported financial application which can be downloaded and used.

Recognition
In 2012 YemenSoft was listed by RED HERRING as one of the 100 companies around the world that provide products according to international standards and "clear future vision". In 2013 YemenSoft was honored as the "best company of software development" by Investor Corporation, General Investment Authority and Commercial Industrial Chambers Union.

Partnership
In 2002, YemenSoft was chosen by the World Bank for the Yemeni Government Computerization project in partnership with Synerma and Computer Engineering World.

References

Companies of Yemen